Articles about notable spectroscopists.

A
William de Wiveleslie Abney
David Alter
Anders Jonas Ångström

B
Roman Balabin
Johann Balmer
G. Michael Bancroft
Charles Glover Barkla
Nikolay Basov
Jane Blankenship
Nicolaas Bloembergen
Niels Bohr
Frederick Sumner Brackett (1896–1988), discovered the hydrogen Brackett series.
Bertram Brockhouse
John Browning
Robert Bunsen

C
Miguel A. Catalán (1894–1957)
Arthur Compton
William Crookes
Robert Curl
Clair Cameron Patterson

D
Louis de Broglie
Peter Debye

E
Richard R. Ernst

F
Edward Robert Festing
James Franck
Willis H. Flygare

G
Roy J. Glauber
Walter Gordy
G.V.Pawan Kumar

H
August Hagenbach
John L. Hall
Theodor W. Hänsch
Werner Heisenberg
Brian Henderson (physicist)
John Herschel
William Herschel
Gerhard Herzberg
Victor Francis Hess
Antony Hewish
William Huggins

I

J
Derek Jackson (1906–1982), made the first spectroscopic determination of a nuclear magnetic spin.
Pierre Janssen

K
Michael Kasha
Alfred Kastler
Gustav Kirchhoff
Harry Kroto

L
Willis Eugene Lamb
George Downing Liveing (1827–1924)
Norman Lockyer
Derek Long
Hendrik Lorentz
Theodore Lyman

M
Alfred Maddock
Gary E. Martin
Thomas Melvill
Allan Merchant, spectral properties of the Baslescu-Lenard Equation
Robert Andrews Millikan
Edward Morley
Rudolf Mössbauer

N

O

P
August Herman Pfund (1879–1949), discovered the Pfund hydrogen spectral series.
Max Planck (1858–1947)
Bill Price
Aleksandr Mikhailovich Prokhorov

Q

R
Isidor Isaac Rabi
Sir Chandrasekhara Venkata Raman
Norman Foster Ramsey Jr.
Carl David Tolmé Runge (1856–1927), Runge–Kutta method, Runge's phenomenon, Laplace–Runge–Lenz vector
Johannes Rydberg
Martin Ryle

S
Sérgio Pereira da Silva Porto
Victor Schumann (1841–1913), discovered the vacuum ultraviolet.
Arthur Leonard Schawlow
Angelo Secchi
Kai Siegbahn
Manne Siegbahn
Richard Smalley
Johannes Stark
Miriam Michael Stimson (1913–2002), pioneered the KBr disk technique for Infrared spectroscopy of solid compounds.

T
William Fox Talbot
Matthew Pothen Thekaekara
Charles Hard Townes

U

V
Joseph von Fraunhofer
Philipp Eduard Anton von Lenard

W
Charles Wheatstone
Kurt Wüthrich

X
Xiaoliang Sunney Xie, (born 1962), chemist at Harvard University, pioneer in the field of single molecule microscopy and coherent anti-Stokes Raman spectroscopy microscopy.

Y
Charles Augustus Young (1834–1908), solar spectroscopist astronomer.

Z
Pieter Zeeman
Ahmed Zewail

See also
List of chemists
List of physicists

Lists of physicists by field
 
Spectroscopy